Maryfield College is a voluntary secondary school for girls within the free secondary education system, situated in the Drumcondra/Whitehall area. The school was founded in 1945 by the Sisters of the Cross and Passion and is now part of The Le Cheile Schools Trust.

References

Secondary schools in Fingal